South Down may refer to:

 South Down (Assembly constituency), for the Northern Ireland Assembly
 South Down (Northern Ireland Parliament constituency)
 South Down (UK Parliament constituency)
 South Down GAA, hurling team

See also
 Southdown (disambiguation)
 South Downs, England
 Down south (disambiguation)
Electoral district of Southern Downs
Arundel and South Downs (UK Parliament constituency)